Adam Simon (born February 6, 1962) is an American director, producer, and screenwriter. His directing credits include Brain Dead (1990), Body Chemistry II: The Voice of a Stranger (1992), and Carnosaur (1993). Simon, along with producer Brannon Braga, co-created the television series Salem. As a screenwriter, Simon is known for Bones (2001), The Haunting in Connecticut (2009), and Books of Blood (2020).

Career
He plays a humorous version of himself, pitching a project and getting barred from the studio lot in the famous opening-shot of Robert Altman's The Player (1992). He previously appeared, thinly veiled, as a fictional character in Christopher Guest's film The Big Picture (1989) and would reappear in Kim Newman's novel Johnny Alucard (2013), where he again pitches a project and becomes the only person in Hollywood standing up to a particularly sinister studio executive.

Kim Newman has noted that Adam Simon has "become one of the most oft-cited figures in contemporary Hollywood satire, and those in the know have begun to play the game of Simon-spotting. [...] Remarkable look- and act-alikes for Adam Simon have appeared in a couple of sinister Hollywood satires: Adam Rafkin (Jarrad Paul) on the cancelled-too-soon TV series Action, who ruins his emotional and physical health on successive drafts of Beverly Hills Gun Club for sleazy überproducer Peter Dragon (Jay Mohr); and Adam Kesher (Justin Theroux) in David Lynch's Mulholland Drive, who finds his entire life - and film project - jeopardised when he considers going against the wishes of backers who represent either organised crime or Hell."

Filmography

Film

Television

Actor

References

External links

1962 births
American film directors
Living people